Oskar Ågren (born 28 April 2000) is a Swedish professional footballer who plays as a defender for Major League Soccer club San Jose Earthquakes.

Career

Youth, College & Amateur
Ågren played semi-professionally for LB07's first team from 2014. In 2019, Ågren moved to the United States to play college soccer at Clemson University. In three seasons with the Tigers, he made 61 appearances, scoring six goals and tallying seven assists, also earning numerous honours including; All-ACC Academic Team member in 2019, Second-team All-ACC in 2020, First-team All-ACC in 2021, and was a MAC Hermann Trophy Finalist. Whilst at college in the United States, Ågren continued to play with LB07 in Sweden during the summer.

Professional 
On January 11, 2022, Ågren was drafted 13th overall in the 2022 MLS SuperDraft by San Jose Earthquakes after acquiring the pick from D.C. United for a second-round selection and $100k in General Allocation Money. On February 18, 2022, he signed with the Major League Soccer side on a deal with club options until 2025. During his first season with San Jose, Ågren 
appeared for San Jose Earthquakes II in the MLS Next Pro.

Personal 
Oskar is the son of former Swedish footballer Per Ågren.

References

External links 
 Oskar Ågren at Clemson Athletics
 MLS profile

1998 births
Living people
Association football defenders
Clemson Tigers men's soccer players
Expatriate soccer players in the United States
IF Limhamn Bunkeflo (men) players
Major League Soccer players
MLS Next Pro players
San Jose Earthquakes draft picks
San Jose Earthquakes players
Footballers from Malmö
Swedish expatriate footballers
Swedish expatriate sportspeople in the United States
Swedish footballers